Will Buxton (born 14 February 1981) is a British Formula One digital presenter and reporter who works for Liberty Media.

Early career
Whilst at university Buxton started writing for GrandPrix.com. In 2002 he joined the Official Formula 1 Magazine, and was a staff writer there until it closed in February 2004, when he went on to freelance work.

Buxton was offered the role of press officer for the inaugural GP2 Series of 2005, and was later promoted to Director of Communications. In 2008 Buxton became editor of the GPWeek virtual magazine, and in 2009 he started providing live commentary for the GP2 Series and GP2 Asia Series for Formula One Group.

Motorsport
In 2014, Buxton was invited to participate in the Inaugural Florida Winter Series. He only participated in 3 events, alongside names such as double Formula 1 World Champion Max Verstappen, current Aston Martin race driver Lance Stroll and former Williams race driver Nicolas Latifi.

Formula 1
In 2010, Buxton joined Speed, a motorsports channel which was owned by Fox Sports, as Formula 1 pit-lane reporter, until it lost the rights to broadcast F1 at the end of 2012. In 2013, the broadcasting rights for Formula 1 went to NBC Sports, where Buxton resumed his role as pit-lane reporter, as well as later joining NBC's broadcast team for Indycar races, until 2017.

In a Sky Sports F1 interview in December 2017, Buxton supported the changes Liberty Media had made whilst running Formula 1, despite these changes having lost him his job at NBC Sports.

Buxton returned to Formula 1 in an official capacity in 2018, becoming Formula One Group's first Digital Presenter. He hosts a number of features on their official YouTube channel, including Weekend Warm-Up (formerly Paddock Pass), a feature he carried over from NBC.

Buxton has appeared in all five seasons of Netflix's documentary series Formula 1: Drive to Survive based on the 2018, 2019, 2020, 2021, and 2022 Formula 1 seasons giving his opinions on the events covered in the series.

In 2019, Buxton released his first book, titled: My Greatest Defeat: Stories of Hardship and Hope from Motor Racing's Finest Heroes, featuring illustrations from Giuseppe Camuncoli.

Filmography

Games

Personal life
Buxton was born in Portsmouth, but grew up in Malvern, Worcestershire. He attended King's School, Worcester where he was a chorister at Worcester Cathedral under Donald Hunt. He went on to study at Lord Wandsworth College and Sixth Form College, Farnborough in Hampshire before studying Politics at the University of Leeds.

In 2018 Buxton announced he was engaged to Victoria Helyar, who worked in marketing for Racing Point F1 Team. They married on 16 April 2022.

References

1981 births
Living people
People educated at King's School, Worcester
People educated at Lord Wandsworth College
Alumni of the University of Leeds
Formula One journalists and reporters
Motorsport announcers
English male journalists